Greenhill Ogham Stones (CIIC 57–58) are two ogham stones forming a National Monument located in County Cork, Ireland.

Location
Greenhill Ogham Stones are located 7.4 km (4.6 mi) south-southeast of Mallow.

History
The stones were carved in the 5th century AD. Greenhill I is dated to the early 6th century, and Greenhill II to the 5th century (first half, or early second half).

Description
Greenhill I measures 260 × 72 × 35 cm. The inscription is TṚENỤ [MA]QỊ MUCOI QRITTI (of Trén/Trian son of the descendant of Creth? (Crothrige?)')

Greenhill II measures 154 × 46 × 36 cm. The inscription is CATTUBUTTAS Ṃ[AQI] (of Cathub [son of])

References

National Monuments in County Cork
Ogham inscriptions
5th-century inscriptions